USS Alexandria may refer to the following ships of the United States Navy:

 , was a paddle steamer commissioned in 1862 and sold in 1865
 , was a  patrol frigate
 , is a  commissioned in 1991 and currently in service

United States Navy ship names